Pegia is a genus of plants in the subfamily Spondiadoideae of the cashew and sumac family Anacardiaceae.

Description
Pegia species grow as shrubs, sarmentose trees or lianas. They are polygamous, woody climbers. The ovoid or oblong fruits have a red or purple skin with a red mesocarp. Pegia species grow naturally in tropical Asia.

Species
The Plant List and Flora of China recognise about 2 accepted species:
 Pegia nitida 
 Pegia sarmentosa

References

Anacardiaceae
Anacardiaceae genera